The RFL Women's Rugby League was an amateur women's rugby league competition in the United Kingdom. First played for in 2014, the league ran for three seasons. It was replaced in 2017 by a new three division structure comprising the Women's Super League, the Women's Championship and the Women's Championship 1.

Teams

Champions

See also

Women's Rugby League Conference
Women's rugby league
Women's Rugby League World Cup
RFL Women's Challenge Cup

Notes

References

External links

Women's
Women's rugby league competitions in England
2014 establishments in the United Kingdom
Sports leagues established in 2014
Rugby league